Eleven is a compilation album by German rock group Reamonn. It was released on 27 August 2010 through Island Records/Universal Music Group. The album was certified Gold in Germany in 2011, and has charted in Germany, Austria, Switzerland and Greece.

Promotion
"Yesterday" was released as the lead single to promote the album on 7 August 2010.

The second single from Eleven, "Colder", was released on 9 November 2010.

Track listing

Personnel
Reamonn
Rea Garvey – vocals, guitar
Uwe Bossert – guitar
Mike "Gomezz" Gommeringer – drums
Philipp Rauenbusch – bass guitar
Sebastian Padotzke – keyboards, saxophone, flute

Charts

Weekly charts

Certifications

References

2010 compilation albums
Island Records compilation albums
Reamonn albums